Algrange (Lorraine Franconian: Oolgréngen or Algréngen) is a commune in the Moselle department in Grand Est in northeastern France. They have an association football team, AS Algrange, playing in the regional divisions, who reached the 8th round of the 2000–01 Coupe de France, losing on penalties to Levallois SC.

Population

Personalities
 Hervé Laborne (born 7 October 1946), electrical engineer and President of university.
 Adolf Wagner (1 October 1890 - 12 April 1944) : Gauleiter of the Gau München-Oberbayern.
 Josef Wagner (12 January 1899 – 22 April or 2 May 1945): Gauleiter of the Gau of Westphalia-South.

See also 
 Communes of the Moselle department

References

External links 
 

Communes of Moselle (department)